This is a list of countries by total waterways length (km) mostly based on The World Factbook accessed in May 2009.

Notes

Lists of countries by economic indicator